Citybikes Workers' Cooperative is a worker-run bike shop in Portland, Oregon, United States, focused on bike commuting and cycle touring.  It encompasses two retail locations/shops: the Annex, specializing in new and used bike sales; and the Repair Shop, specializing in used bike parts.

History
Citybikes was founded by Roger Noehren as a sole proprietorship in 1986, in the current Repair Shop building. He hired Tim Calvert in August 1989 to transform Citybikes into a worker owned cooperative (w/o RN), which came into being in January 1990. Business continued to grow, and in 1995, Citybikes expanded to the Annex building (instigated by RN, who returned in 1994).  At this time, Citybikes began to sell a higher volume of used bikes, and also to carry new bikes.  The Annex space was further remodeled/expanded in 2002, and the Repair Shop was remodeled, to double the retail space, in 2008.  Citybikes has grown from a fledgling enterprise to a successful cooperatively run business employing about 20 people in winter, and 25 in summer.

Cooperative structure
Citybikes operates with consensus-based decision making.  The majority of decisions that affect the cooperative are made in bimonthly general meetings, with all workers present having equal say and voting power.  Day-to-day operations are also carried out by consensus - Citybikes does not have any managers or traditional hierarchy.  The board of directors is made up of the worker-owners, and is responsible for the long-term interests of the cooperative, setting goals and making final decisions on policies and procedures.  Ownership is available to all workers who meet certain time and responsibility commitments.  Currently, about half of workers are worker-owners.

Gender balance has played an important role since the shop's inception.  Men and women each make up roughly half of the Board of Directors, and workforce as a whole.

Apprenticeship program
Every other autumn, Citybikes conducts a program wherein people can apply for apprenticeship positions.  Apprenticeship is a two-year program which trains people to be both skilled mechanics, and effective workers within the cooperative structure.  In addition to training people for cooperative bike shop work specifically, apprenticeship is an avenue for underrepresented populations (e.g. women and minorities) to enter the bike industry.

D.I.Y.
Citybikes holds classes for the public to learn bike maintenance in the winter, and also hosts bi-weekly "drop-in nights" where the public can work on their own bikes with staff assistance.  Repair stands and simple tools are available to borrow during shop hours, enabling customers to use the shop's resources to repair their own bikes at no cost. The Repair Shop location has a room devoted to used bike parts for shoppers to rummage through.

References 

http://www.bizjournals.com/portland/stories/2002/09/23/story4.html?jst=cn_cn_lk
http://www.bizjournals.com/portland/stories/2002/09/30/story4.html?page=all

External links 

 The official Citybikes website

Cycling in Portland, Oregon
Organizations based in Portland, Oregon
Organizations established in 1986
Worker cooperatives of the United States
1986 establishments in Oregon